Amphicarpaea, commonly known as hogpeanut, is a genus of flowering plants in the legume family, Fabaceae. It belongs to the subfamily Faboideae.

Species include:
A. bracteata – eastern North America
A. edgeworthii Benth. – eastern and southeast Asia (China, India, Japan, Korea, Russia, Vietnam)

It is classified in subtribe Glycininae and its closest relatives are Glycine and Teramnus:

References

Phaseoleae
Fabaceae genera